Decimoputzu ( or ) is a comune (municipality) of about 4,000 inhabitants in the Province of South Sardinia in the Italian region Sardinia, located about  northwest of Cagliari.

Decimoputzu borders the following municipalities: Decimomannu, Siliqua, Vallermosa, Villasor, Villaspeciosa.

See also
Casteddu de Fanaris
Hypogeum of Sant'Iroxi

References 

Cities and towns in Sardinia